Kudrna (feminine: Kudrnová) is a Czech surname. It may refer to:

 Andrej Kudrna, Slovak ice hockey player
 Bohumil Kudrna, Czech canoeist
 Jan Kudrna, Czech ice hockey player
 Jaroslav Kudrna, Czech ice hockey player
 Ladislav Kudrna, Czech ice hockey player
 Vladimír Kudrna, Czech sport shooter
 Zdeněk Kudrna, Czech speedway rider

See also
 

Czech-language surnames